re.press is a Melbourne (Australia) based open access publisher of contemporary philosophy (and some theory and poetry). re.press is an independent publisher that seeks to promote philosophical ideas through making many of its works available for free in electronic form (PDF downloads) in addition to hard-copy paperbacks.

History
re.press began publishing in 2006 with the edited collection “The Praxis of Alain Badiou” and since then has published authors such as Alain Badiou, G. W. F. Hegel, Graham Harman, Andrew Benjamin, Reza Negarestani and the poet Attar.

Open access
re.press was one of the first publishers to offer books as open access or free downloads. There has been some discussion of the “re.press model” on the blogging network and whether this is a sustainable model.

Series
re.press publishes in three series: Anamnesis, Transmission and Anomaly. Anamnesis and Transmission publish philosophy and Anomaly publishes other works including poetry and speculative fiction. The open access free downloads seem to be confined to the Anamnesis and Transmission series.

Cover art
According to re.press’ website they are committed to “maximizing design values, boosting clarity and aesthetic qualities”. This commitment is expressed through the use of Melbourne-based artists on their covers. According to their website:
“re.press aims to publish the best philosophical works available, whether these emerge from well-established or from previously unknown thinkers, whether they are from the North or the South, the East or the West, whether they are Platonists or Hegelians, materialists or idealists. True thought is global, universal, transformative, shredding ideologies and opinions like the statues of old dictators. But true thought also begins locally, in images and signs that may as yet have no recognisable reference or import. re.press' head offices are located in the city of Melbourne, Australia. And Melbourne is, as the art-critic Norbert Loeffler has remarked, one of the great art-cities of the world - without anybody knowing it. Lacking the established power, media and reputation of traditional centres of world art, Melbourne forces its artists to sustain themselves otherwise. Aware of contemporary work from all over the world, local artists transmute it for their own, often-obscure purposes, into unprecedented forms. re.press seeks, like an insatiable kleptoparasite, to draw off some of this aesthetic power for its own ends, by using their images for its cover-art.”

See also

 Open Book Publishers
 Open Humanities Press
 Punctum Books

References

External links
 re.press homepage

Contemporary philosophical literature
Publishing companies of Australia
Companies established in 2006
Open access publishers